Yasser Matar (Arabic:ياسر مطر) (born 20 September 1985) is an Emirati footballer who currently plays as midfielder .

External links

References

Emirati footballers
1985 births
Living people
Al Jazira Club players
Al Ain FC players
Al Wahda FC players
Fujairah FC players
Al Urooba Club players
Footballers at the 2006 Asian Games
UAE First Division League players
UAE Pro League players
Association football midfielders
Asian Games competitors for the United Arab Emirates